Henry George "Gino" Watkins FRGS (29 January 1907 – c. 20 August 1932) was a British Arctic explorer and nephew of Bolton Eyres-Monsell, 1st Viscount Monsell.

Biography
Born in London, he was educated at Lancing College and acquired a love of mountaineering and the outdoors from his father through holidays in the Alps, the Tyrol and the English Lake District. He became interested in polar exploration while studying at Trinity College, Cambridge under the tutelage of James Wordie, and organised his first expedition, to Edgeøya, in the summer of 1927.

Watkins also learnt to fly, as one of the first members of the Cambridge University Air Squadron.

In 1928–9, Watkins made an expedition to Labrador, where he established a base at North West River and explored much previously unmapped territory, including Snegamook Lake. However, his most important expedition was the British Arctic Air Route Expedition of 1930–31. Watkins led a team of fourteen men to survey the east coast of Greenland and monitor weather conditions there, the information being needed for a planned air route from England to Winnipeg. In addition to meeting these aims, the expedition discovered the Skaergaard intrusion, and Watkins and two companions, Percy Lemon and Augustine Courtauld, made an open boat journey of  around the King Frederick VI Coast in the south of Greenland.

The expedition won Watkins the 1932 Founder's Medal from the Royal Geographical Society, and brought him international fame. In addition, one of the members of Watkins' expedition, Augustine Courtauld, solo-manned a meteorological observation post in the interior of the Greenland ice pack during the 1930–31 winter, generating the first data set from this previously inaccessible location. The expedition also included as ski expert and naturalist Freddie Spencer Chapman, who would later gain fame as a soldier in Japanese-occupied Malaya. 

 
Watkins next attempted to organise an expedition to cross Antarctica, but in the depths of the Great Depression finance proved impossible to raise. Instead he returned to Greenland in 1932 with a small team on the East Greenland Expedition to continue the work of his air route expedition. On 20 August he went hunting for seals in his kayak in Tuttilik (Tugtilik Fjord) and did not return. Later that day, his empty kayak was found floating upside down by his companions. His body was never found. There is a memorial to him inside St Peter's Church in Dumbleton, Gloucestershire.

Honours
In 1932 he was awarded the Hans Egede Medal by the Royal Danish Geographical Society.

Watkins is also commemorated by the Gino Watkins Memorial Fund, managed by the Royal Geographical Society and the Scott Polar Research Institute at the University of Cambridge, which provides grants for polar exploration. Watkins Island, a sub-Antarctic island in the Southern Ocean, commemorates Watkins.

The Watkins Range, Greenland's highest mountain range, bears his name.

The Gino Watkins Glacier, in New Zealand's Whataroa watershed, and the close peaks of Gino and Watkins on the Barrier Range, also commemorate Watkins.

Further reading

 
 Courtauld, Simon, The Watkins Boys, London, Michael Russell, 2010. .

 Scott, J. M., The Land That God Gave Cain, London, Chatto and Windus, 1933.

 Roberts, David, Into the Great Emptiness, Norton, 2023

References

A new account of Watkins in Greenland is David Roberts, Into the Great Emptiness. Norton 2022. Reviewed in The Wall Street Journal, July 16-17, 2022

External links
Photographs of Gino Watkins at the National Portrait Gallery

1907 births
1932 deaths
Fellows of the Royal Geographical Society
People educated at Lancing College
Alumni of Trinity College, Cambridge
Explorers of the Arctic
English explorers
English polar explorers
Recipients of the Polar Medal